Izirtu was the capital of the Mannai state, which existed from the 9th century BC to the 6th century BC.

About 
According to researchers, Izirtu was located near the modern city of Zivia in northwestern Iran. Izirtu, like other Manna cities, was surrounded by defensive fortifications. The city had two- and three-story buildings, as well as temples. In 716 BC, Sargon II , the ruler of Assyria, captured and burned Izirtu. However, the city was soon rebuilt. In 650 BC, the Assyrian ruler Ashurbanipal again conquered and destroyed Izirtu.

References 

Mannaeans